Bishop's Cove is a town in the Canadian province of Newfoundland and Labrador situated in Spaniard's Bay on the Avalon Peninsula.

History 
Originally called Bread and Cheese Cove, the cove was renamed for the Rev. John Inglis, an Anglican bishop who toured Newfoundland in 1827 after it became part of his diocese. Early family names in the area include "Smith", "Barrett" and several variations of "Menchions", with possible claims to the land going back as early as 1625.

Demographics 

See also
 List of cities and towns in Newfoundland and Labrador

References

Towns in Newfoundland and Labrador